Darko Entertainment is a production company that was launched in late 2007 by writer/director Richard Kelly, who is best known for directing the 2001 cult classic Donnie Darko. Based in Los Angeles, it creates, produces and finances director-driven films, the first of which was Southland Tales. Other notable Darko Entertainment films include World's Greatest Dad, God Bless America, The Box, and Bad Words.

References

External links 
 
 Darko Entertainment at the Internet Movie Database

Companies based in Los Angeles
Film production companies of the United States
American companies established in 2007
2007 establishments in California